Pikrolimni (Greek Πικρολίμνη 'bitter lake') may refer to:

 Pikrolimni (lake), a lake in Central Macedonia, Greece
 Pikrolimni (municipality), a former municipality, now a municipal unit, based around the lake